Timothy J. Dixon is a British professor who holds the professorial chair in sustainable futures in the built environment at the University of Reading (School of the Built Environment). 
His research encompasses city foresight, futures studies, sustainable futures in the built environment and social sustainability.

Publications 
 Sustainable Futures in the Built Environment to 2050. Wiley (2018). 
 Urban Retrofitting for Sustainability: Mapping the Transition to 2050 (2014). Routledge. 
 Urban Regeneration and Social Sustainability: Best Practice from European Cities (2010) 
 Real Estate & the New Economy: The Impact of Information and Communications Technology. John Wiley & Sons (2005).

References

External links
 Profile page at University of Reading.
 Reading 2050 Project
 Cities on frontline of Climate Change Struggle (April, 2014)
 What the experts say: how to make our cities more sustainable (April 2015)
 Urban rooms allow people to design their city's future (January 2019)

Year of birth missing (living people)
Living people
Place of birth missing (living people)
Academics of the University of Reading